Jermaine Levan Kearse (born February 6, 1990) is a former American football wide receiver. He played eight seasons in National Football League (NFL). He was signed by the Seattle Seahawks as an undrafted free agent in 2012 and later won Super Bowl XLVIII with the team, beating the Denver Broncos. Kearse played college football at Washington. Kearse also played for the New York Jets and Detroit Lions.

Early years
Kearse grew up as a military brat; his father was a non-commissioned officer in the U.S. Army. While living at Fort Lewis (now Joint Base Lewis–McChord), south of Tacoma, Washington, he attended Lakes High School in Lakewood and played high school football for the Lancers. As a senior, he caught 54 passes for 903 yards and eight touchdowns.

College career
Kearse attended the University of Washington in Seattle, playing for the Huskies of the Pac-12 Conference. In his time there, he played under head coaches Tyrone Willingham and Steve Sarkesian. As a true freshman in 2008, he played in all 12 games, with two starts, and had 20 receptions for 301 yards and two touchdowns. As a sophomore in 2009 in his first season with Sarkesian, Kearse started nine of 12 games and led the team in receptions with 50; yards with 866; and touchdowns with eight. He was named a second-team All-Pac-10 selection.

As a junior in 2010, Kearse started all 13 games and again led the team in receptions with 63 for 1,005 yards and 12 touchdowns. He was named second-team All-Pac-10 for the second consecutive year. As a senior in 2011, he had 47 receptions for 699 yards and seven touchdowns.

College statistics

Professional career

Seattle Seahawks

2012 season
Kearse was signed by the Seattle Seahawks as an undrafted free agent on April 28, 2012. he made his NFL debut on November 4 and had a six-yard reception against the Minnesota Vikings. He appeared in seven games as a rookie for Seattle in 2012, finishing with three catches for 31 yards and playing on special teams. Kearse underwent LASIK surgery during the offseason to improve his vision.

2013 season
During the 2013 season in a Week 1 game against the Carolina Panthers, Kearse caught a 43-yard touchdown pass from quarterback Russell Wilson late in the fourth quarter to lift the Seahawks to a 12–7 score. The score was the first of Kearse's professional career.

In a Week 5 game against the Indianapolis Colts, Kearse had a 28-yard reception for a touchdown, and blocked a punt which resulted in a safety in the 34–28 loss. In Week 10 against the Atlanta Falcons, he scored a 43-yard touchdown after a trick play when Marshawn Lynch threw the ball back to Russell Wilson in the 33–10 victory. In 2013, Kearse played 15 games with 346 receiving yards and four touchdowns.

In the NFC Championship on January 19, 2014, against division rival San Francisco 49ers, Kearse caught a 35-yard touchdown pass from Wilson. The Seahawks eventually won the game 23–17 and advanced to Super Bowl XLVIII. During the Super Bowl against the Denver Broncos, Kearse had four catches for 65 yards including a 23-yard touchdown catch in the third quarter, breaking four tackles to get into the endzone. The Seahawks won 43–8, giving Kearse and the team their first Super Bowl win in franchise history.

2014 season
In the 2014 regular season, Kearse played 15 games with 537 receiving yards and a touchdown. In Week 5, against the Washington Redskins, he caught his lone touchdown of the season in the 27–17 victory.

In Week 3, in a Super Bowl XLVIII rematch against the Denver Broncos, Kearse threw the first pass of his NFL career, a 17-yard pass to Russell Wilson, in the 26–20 overtime victory.

In the Divisional Round  against the Carolina Panthers, Kearse continued his streak of catching touchdowns in postseason games with a 63-yard catch-and-run in the second quarter, catching the ball with one hand. He would catch two other passes in the game, each going for 33 yards, and lead all receivers with 129 receiving yards on his three catches. The Seahawks won 31–17 and advanced to the NFC Championship.

In the NFC Championship against the Green Bay Packers, Kearse caught his only completion, a 35-yard game-winning overtime touchdown to give Seattle a 28–22 win after falling behind 16–0 at halftime. The victory sent the Seahawks to the Super Bowl for the second year in a row. Kearse had been targeted on five throws earlier in the game, the first four being intercepted (two of them tipped by Kearse) and the fifth being incomplete. It was the fourth straight postseason game in which Kearse caught a touchdown pass.

In the final minute of Super Bowl XLIX, Kearse caught the ball after a Wilson pass was tipped by cornerback Malcolm Butler and the ball bounced four times off Kearse's body before he secured the ball. The play seemingly looked to be a remake of the Helmet Catch. However, Butler intercepted Wilson at the goal line with under 30 seconds remaining, therefore foiling the Seahawks a chance for the second championship in a row as they lost to the Patriots 28-24.

2015 season
In the 2015 season, Kearse caught eight passes for 76 yards in the season-opening 34–31 overtime loss in St. Louis against the Rams, setting a new single-game high for receptions (breaking his previous record of five). In Week 5 in Cincinnati, Kearse caught his first touchdown of the season on a 30-yard pass from Wilson in the 27–24 loss. In Week 11 against the Pittsburgh Steelers, Kearse recorded four receptions for 47 yards and two touchdowns, in the 39–30 victory for his first career multi-touchdown game. In Week 15, against the Cleveland Browns, he had a career-high 110 receiving yards in the 30–13 victory. Kearse started all 16 games for the first time of his career and finished the year with 685 receiving yards and a career-high five touchdowns.

In the Divisional Round against the Carolina Panthers, Kearse had 11 receptions for 110 yards and two touchdowns as the Seahawks lost by a score of 31–24.

2016 season
In the 2016 season, Kearse caught 41 passes for 511 yards and one touchdown. Seattle won the NFC West and made the playoffs. His lone touchdown came in Week 16, against the Arizona Cardinals in the 34–31 defeat on Christmas Eve. They defeated the Detroit Lions in the Wild Card Round before falling to the eventual NFC Champion Atlanta Falcons in the Divisional Round.

New York Jets

2017 season
On September 1, 2017, Kearse, along with a 2018 second-round draft pick, were traded to the New York Jets in exchange for defensive tackle Sheldon Richardson.

On September 10, in the season opener, Kearse made his Jets debut, recording seven receptions for 59 yards in the 21–12 loss to the Buffalo Bills. In Week 2, against the Oakland Raiders, he had four receptions for 64 yards and his first two receiving touchdowns with the Jets, both coming from quarterback Josh McCown. His performance against the Raiders was only the second multi-touchdown game of his career. During Week 12 against the Carolina Panthers, Kearse had 7 receptions for 105 receiving yards and a touchdown. He and fellow receiver Robby Anderson both had over 100 receiving yards in the same game in a Jets lost 35-27. During Week 13 against the Kansas City Chiefs, Kearse had another outstanding performance, highlighted by a spectacular one-handed catch by the sideline boundary line and a 51-yard reception play later in the game. He finished the game with 9 receptions and 157 receiving yards as the Jets won 38-31. Overall, in the 2017 season, he finished with 65 receptions for 810 receiving yards and five receiving touchdowns.

2018 season
In Week 6, against the Indianapolis Colts, he had nine receptions for a season-high 94 yards. He had his first receiving touchdown of the season in Week 11 against the New England Patriots. He finished the 2018 season with 37 receptions for 371 receiving yards and one receiving touchdown.

Detroit Lions
On June 6, 2019, Kearse signed with the Detroit Lions. On August 8, 2019, Kearse suffered a broken leg early in the first quarter in Week 1 of the preseason against the New England Patriots. He was placed on injured reserve on August 10, 2019.

Kearse announced his retirement on September 29, 2020.

NFL career statistics

Business ventures and endorsements 
On July 28, 2017, Kitsap Credit Union and Jermaine Kearse announced a formal partnership. Kearse acted as the credit union's celebrity spokesperson from August 2017 through April 2018.

Personal life
Kearse married Marisa Ventura. The couple have two daughters. Kearse is a Christian.

Kearse is currently a program assistant at the University of Washington.

See also
 Washington Huskies football statistical leaders

References

External links
Washington Huskies bio 

Living people
1990 births
African-American players of American football
American football wide receivers
Detroit Lions players
New York Jets players
People from Lakewood, Washington
Players of American football from Washington (state)
Seattle Seahawks players
Sportspeople from the Seattle metropolitan area
Washington Huskies football players
Washington Huskies football coaches
21st-century African-American sportspeople